"Ode to the Bouncer" is a song written, performed and produced by electropop group Studio Killers. The energetic three-minute and 26-second dance-pop song, which plays in the key of F-sharp major, tells the story of somebody trying to dance but being prevented by a bouncer from doing so. Break beats, synth loops and vocals are depicted in the song's arrangement. Dyna Mink and Goldie Foxx composed the tune, while the lyrics were made by vocalist Chubby Cherry.

The single was first issued on 6 April 2011 as the lead single from Studio Killers' self-titled debut studio album, which was later released in 2013. The music video was released on 7 April. The single was the most successful in the Netherlands, where it was number one on charts such as the Dutch Top 40 and Mega Single Top 100 and went gold. It also made several chart appearances in Denmark, Finland, and Belgium. The song has been met with positive critical reviews, with praise going towards the song's production and arrangement. It became the anthem of benefit event Serious Request on the Dutch radio station 3FM in 2011, and appeared on Spin's "20 Best Songs of the Summer" that same year.

Production and composition
Studio Killers formed after bandmembers Dyna Mink and Goldie Foxx had a tune to be sent to a girl group in the United Kingdom. However, the girl group dropped from their label, and by then the two had nobody to write lyrics for the song or release it. They met up with Chubby Cherry at an international airport, suggesting that she be the track's vocalist and lyricist, thus forming Studio Killers. The tune was used for "Ode to the Bouncer".  Dyna Mink played the keyboards, which were programmed by Goldie Foxx, and Chubby Cherry was vocalist. James F. Reynolds mixed the song and handled additional production, while Dick Beetham mastered it at 360 Mastering in London.

"Ode to the Bouncer" is an energetic electropop dance-pop track with influences of Giorgio Moroder, Vince Clarke, Daft Punk and ABBA. The piece is in the key of F Mixolydian, and plays for 3 minutes and 26 seconds at a tempo of 123 beats per minute.
Lyrically, the song depicts a woman trying to get into a nightclub by claiming that it's her birthday, that she has friends inside, and that she's not wearing any underwear or proper shoes for the cold temperature outside, only for the bouncer to continue to refuse her entrance. She then begins insulting the "empowered and aroused" bouncer and the song eventually culminates with her sneaking into the club through the ladies' room window. The production includes "skipping break beats" and "synth loops", and Scandipop.co.uk described it as "a cross between PWL or Pete Hammond back in the 80′s, and modern day Scandinavian electro acts like Eva & The Heartmaker or Electric Lady Lab."

Release

A music video for "Ode to the Bouncer" premiered on 7 April 2011. The animated video depicts Cherry trying to fight a bouncer to get into a club. The song was released as the lead single for the group's self-titled debut album, where it appears as the first track. The single was first issued in Norway and Sweden on 6 April 2011. It was later released on 2 May 2011 in Denmark, before premiering in the United Kingdom, United States and Finland later that year.

The song reached number one on record charts in the Netherlands: the Digital Songs, Dutch Top 40, Mega Dance Top 30, Mega Top 50 and Single Top 100. It also appeared on record charts in Denmark, Finland and Belgium. "Ode to the Bouncer" was the anthem of benefit event Serious Request on the Dutch radio station 3FM in 2011, and a version of the song played on the station was released as a separate single, with the subtitle "This One's For Mama Version". Artists who have remixed the song include Bobby Rock and Pablo Rindt, Feng Shui, Niels van Gogh and Daniel Strauss, M-3ox, Lee Mortimer, Fear of Tigers, and Xilent.

Critical reception
Critical reactions to "Ode to the Bouncer" have been approving, with some reviewers finding it humorous, while liking its production and arrangement. In a review of the group's self-titled debut album, a writer from MuuMuse described the song as "hysterically fierce" and "fresh". Contactmusic.com's Andrew Lockwood found the song "ridiculously catchy", while Scandipop.co.uk called its chorus stunning "both musically and melodically". Federico Antonioni of the Italian online publication concertionline.com labeled the song as an "excellent example of catchy dance music..."

The Irish Times's Jim Carroll called "Ode to the Bouncer" a "Smashing pop humdinger from mysterious combo with Danish, Finnish and UK members who prefer to hide (for now) behind cartoon characters," and a PopJustice writer said that it was a great track "that instantly sounds like something you've known forever." A staff member from the magazine FHM wrote that "The track’s great with lyrical gems like “you’re just another prick at the door” and the sound being some sort of mutant mash-up of Madonna and Gorillaz." Writing for the official site of The Jace Hall Show, Jeff Nau said that "At first, the song is cringingly annoying, but the 3rd time it’s in your head like a chunk of infected code."

Track listing
Streaming & Digital Download
 "Ode to the Bouncer" – 3:26
 "Ode to the Bouncer (Bobby Rock and Pablo Rindt Remix)" – 6:24
 "Ode to the Bouncer (Feng Shui Remix)" – 6:30
 "Ode to the Bouncer (Niels Van Gogh and Daniel Strauss Remix)" – 6:22
 "Ode to the Bouncer (M-3ox Remix)" – 6:26
 "Ode to the Bouncer (Lee Mortimer Remix)" – 5:03
 "Ode to the Bouncer (Fear of Tigers Remix)" – 4:52

Remixes

Manhattan Clique Mixes
 "Ode to the Bouncer (Manhattan Clique Remix)" – 6:37
 "Ode to the Bouncer (Manhattan Clique Instrumental)" – 6:37
 "Ode to the Bouncer (Manhattan Clique Edit)" – 3:38
Niels Van Gogh & Daniel Strauss Mixes
 "Ode to the Bouncer (Niels Van Gogh & Daniel Strauss Remix)" – 6:22
 "Ode to the Bouncer (Niels Van Gogh & Daniel Strauss Edit)" – 3:51
Fear of Tigers Mix
 "Ode to the Bouncer (Fear of Tigers Remix)" – 4:52
Lee Mortimer Mix
 "Ode to the Bouncer (Lee Mortimer Remix)" – 5:03 
Bobby Rock & Pablo Rindt Mix
 "Ode to the Bouncer (Bobby Rock & Pablo Rindt Remix)" – 6:24
M-3ox Mix
 "Ode to the Bouncer (M-3ox Remix)" – 6:26
Feng Shui Mix
 "Ode to the Bouncer (Feng Shui Remix)" – 6:30
Paradise 45 Mix
 "Ode to the Bouncer (Paradise 45 Remix)" – 7:10
Xilent Mix
 "Ode to the Bouncer (Xilent Remix)" – 4:14

Accolades

Charts

Weekly charts

Year-end charts

Release history

See also 
List of Dutch Top 40 number-one singles of 2012

References 

2011 debut singles
Synth-pop songs
Dutch Top 40 number-one singles
Mega Top 50 number-one singles
2011 songs
Animated music videos